
Gmina Miejsce Piastowe is a rural gmina (administrative district) in Krosno County, Subcarpathian Voivodeship, in south-eastern Poland. The current mayor Dorota Chilik was elected in 2018.

Villages
Gmina Miejsce Piastowe contains the villages and settlements of Głowienka, Łężany, Miejsce Piastowe, Niżna Łąka, Rogi, Targowiska, Widacz, Wrocanka and Zalesie.

Neighbouring gminas
Gmina Miejsce Piastowe is bordered by the city of Krosno and by the gminas of Chorkówka, Dukla, Haczów, Iwonicz-Zdrój, Krościenko Wyżne and Rymanów.

References
Commune state report, p.8

Miejsce Piastowe
Krosno County